The 1919 Montana football team represented the University of Montana in the 1919 college football season. They were led by first-year head coach Bernie Bierman, played their home games at Dornblaser Field and finished the season with a record of two wins, three losses and two ties (2–3–2).

Schedule

 One game was played on Thursday (against Washington State on Thanksgiving)

References

Montana
Montana Grizzlies football seasons
Montana football